Claudiu Constantin Moisie (born 13 May 2000) is a Romanian professional footballer who plays as a centre back for Liga I club FC Argeș Pitești.

Club career

Argeș Pitești

He made his Liga I debut for Argeș Pitești against Rapid București on 7 August 2021.

Career statistics

Club

References

External links
 
 

2000 births
Living people
Sportspeople from Pitești
Romanian footballers
Association football defenders
Liga I players
Liga II players
FC Argeș Pitești players
AFC Turris-Oltul Turnu Măgurele players
CS Pandurii Târgu Jiu players
FC Metaloglobus București players